Aardam may refer to:

 Aardam, a hamlet of the town Ter Aar, in the municipality of Nieuwkoop, Netherlands
 Ott Aardam (born 1980), Estonian stage, television, and film actor